Ascendence is the second album by the Australian heavy metal band Lord. It was released on 4 September 2007 by the Melbourne label Modern Invasion and in Japan by Soundholic.

Overview
Pre-production work began on the album in late 2006. In January 2007 Lord Tim started a thread on the band's online forum that detailed the writing and recording process, also revealing that the artwork for the album had already been completed, by the Colombian artist Felipe Machado Franco. Ascendence was recorded at Main Street Studios and the band's studio in Wollongong, Australia. The pop singer Tania Moran recorded backing vocals for several songs and guest musicians Chris Brooks and Mark Furtner added guitar solos in four tracks. Furtner was later added to the group as Lord's permanent second guitarist.

The bonus track varies according to regions. On the Australian release, it is a cover version of a song that originally appeared on the Pantera tribute album The Art of Shredding: A Tribute to Dime, but has since been entirely remixed. On the Japanese release, it is an X Japan cover featuring vocals from the singer of Japanese band Vigilante.

Track listing

Australian bonus track

Japanese bonus track

Personnel
Musical
Lord
 Lord Tim – vocals, guitars, keyboards
 Tim Yatras – drums
 Andrew Dowling – bass guitar

with
 Tania Moran – backing vocals
 Gareth Michael – backing vocals
 Mark Furtner – guitar (on 4, 9)
 Chris Brooks – guitar (on 5, 7)
 Mav Stevens – guitar (on 12, Australian edition)
 Hideaki Niwa – vocals (on 12, Japanese edition)

Technical
 Produced and mixed by Lord Tim at SLS Studios, Wollongong
 Drums and vocals engineered by Adam Jordan at Main Street Studios, Wollongong
 Guitars, bass guitar, keyboards and editing by Lord Tim at SLS Studios, Wollongong

Graphical
 Cover art – Felipe Machado Franco
 Booklet design and layout – Lord Tim
 Photography – Lord Tim and Karyn Hamilton

References

Lord (band) albums
2007 albums